Tongan kava ceremonies play an integral part of Tongan society and governance. Ranging from informal “faikava” or kava “parties” to the highly stratified, ancient, and ritualized Taumafa Kava, or Royal Kava Ceremony, Tongan kava ceremonies continue to permeate Tongan society both in Tonga and diaspora, strengthening cultural values and principles, while solidifying traditional ideals of duty and reciprocity, reaffirming societal structures, and entrenching the practice of pukepuke fonua, or tightly holding on to the land, a Tongan cultural ideal to maintain, preserve, and live traditional Tongan culture.

Origin of Kava 

The Tongan belief on the origins of kava are dominated by the tala tupu’a, traditional oral account, as told by the late Queen Sālote Tupou III and as found in the historical records of venerated Tongan historian, Masiu Moala, as well as the student informational book compiled by the Siasi Uesiliana Tau’atāina ‘o Tonga (Free Wesleyan Church of Tonga). The most popularly accepted account of kava’s origins talks of a poor couple, Fevanga (father) and Fefafa (mother), and their leprous daughter, Kava’onau, who is sacrificed to the then Tu’i Tonga, and from her grave sprouts the kava and tō (sugarcane). However, there are other accounts of kava’s usage by Tongans and deified ancestors that pre-date the Kava’onau story.

Kava in Pulotu 
One of the many stories of kava’s use is found in the account given to Fison by the then Tui Lau, ‘Enele Ma’afu, son of former Tu’i Kanokupolu, ‘Aleamotu’a, and a self made Fijian chief, living in the Lau islands in South-Western Fiji. In this story Ma’afu relates the frequent use of kava by the great gods in Pulotu. He recounts to Fison how Hikule’o, Māui, and Tangaloa, three of the great ancestor gods of the Tongan pantheon, indulged in kava for relaxation purposes, for competition, and in the case of one of the Maui’s, as a peace offering to his father, Māui Motu’a. However, this account does not detail kava’s use in a ceremonial fashion such as in the Taumafa Kava or other instances of installing chiefs. Other accounts of kava usage in Pulotu can be found in the work done by Gifford on the Tongan Society.

'Aho'eitu - 1st Tu'i Tonga 
Kava also plays a very important role in the origin story of the Tu’i Tonga line of kings, Tonga’s first and most sacred line that is said to have controlled a vast Oceanic empire. The Tu’i Tonga line is the progenitor of most Tongan chiefly and noble titles, and even the current ruling house of Tupou can trace their lineage to this senior line. In short, a half-human, by his mother 'Ilaheva Va'epopua, and half-god man named ‘Aho’eitu ascended a great toa tree in search of his father, one of the great sky-gods, Tangaloa ‘Eitumatupu’a. In his search, he happened upon Tangaloa and it is said that he partook of kava with Tangaloa. During his stay in langi, the abode of Tangaloa, where many researchers claim is the sky or even Manu’a, Samoa, ‘Aho’eitu had met and bested his five older brothers in an array of sports. ‘Aho’eitu immediately became the favorite amongst his siblings and out of jealousy, his older brothers led by the eldest, Talafale, killed ‘Aho’eitu, throwing his head into a hoi bush and disposing of the body by eating it. After searching for ‘Aho’eitu, Tangaloa ‘Eitumatupu’a inquire of his five sons and knew what they had done and commanded that a great tāno’a or kumete, kava bowl, be brought to him in which he commanded the five to throw up the remains of ‘Aho’eitu. After they had done so, Tangaloa ‘Eitumatupu’a had covered the kava bowl with leaves of the nonu (noni) tree and ‘Aho’eitu miraculously was brought back to life. It is proclaimed by Tangaloa ‘Eitumatupu’a that ‘Aho’eitu would return to maama, the world and Tonga, to become the Tu’i Tonga, paramount chief/king of Tonga, and his five older brothers would go with him to serve their younger brother and protect him. The eldest of the five, Talafale, became Tu’i Faleua, king of the second house, for if ever ‘Aho’eitu’s line should die out, Talafale and his descendants would then rule. Today the Noble Tu’i Pelehake is the line descendant from Talafale. The other four brothers became the heads of the kau Falefā, the four houses, tasked with specific duties in protecting and providing for 'Aho'eitu and the Tu'i Tonga line.

Many scholars, traditional Tongan chiefs, and kakai ‘ilo, those with special knowledge, do disagree on many of the details relating to the rise of ‘Aho’eitu, but what most agree upon is the use of kava in the installation of ‘Aho’eitu as the Tu’i Tonga. ‘Asipeli Viliami Toluta’u, a professor in sculpture at Brigham Young University - Hawai'i and artist of the ‘Aho’eitu statue that fronts the new St. George government building in Tonga, is rightfully adamant in an interview done on the Radio-Tonga-Hawai’i Vākē-Tali-Folau program that in order to truly understand Tongan tala tupu’a, there needs to be an understanding of Tongan heliaki, metaphorical language, similar to Hawaiian kaona. The kava bowl as commanded by Tangaloa to be brought forth is the beginning of the ceremony at which the five elder siblings, bested by ‘Aho’eitu and favored by Tangaloa, will be installed as the ruler of Tonga, the Tu’i Tonga. Traditionally kava was chewed, mama, before it was mixed and strained into the drink, and in the tale of ‘Aho’eitu, there is heliaki about the elder siblings “eating” their brother and throwing up his body into the tāno’a, kava bowl. This is heliaki speech for their obeisance to the new paramount chief who they recognize as being higher as they must descend below in status to chew his kava and eventually descend from their father’s abode to serve their younger brother.

Kava'onau 
The most popular story about kava’s origins is that of Fevanga and Fefafa and their daughter Kava’onau. In short, an elderly couple lived on the island of ‘Eueiki during a time of great famine, with their daughter Kava’onau. Tradition states she was stricken with leprosy. One day a great chief, many scholars cite it was the 10th Tu’i Tonga, Momo, and his entourage after spending time at sea fishing and competing with each other decided to rest on ‘Eueiki. Somehow the old couple heard of the coming of the king and immediately took to preparing the proper food presentations. However, as it was a time of famine, the couple had only one kape plant, giant taro, and as Fefafa went to get the kape to be cooked in the ‘umu, she found the king resting under its shade. Sorrowful that there was no other worthy meal on the island, the old couple, out of duty and love to their king, decided to sacrifice their daughter as tribute. The warriors and people that had come with the king had found out what was transpiring and had immediately told the king, who out of sadness and regret, ordered the party to depart the island, leaving the girl in her ‘umu grave. After some time, the old couple found two plants had grown from their daughter’s grave. At the head the kava plant and at the feet the tō, sugarcane. As the plants grew, the couple noticed a mouse chewing at the kava and became inebriated, whereas when it ate of the tō it became energized and scurried away. One day the great tufunga fonua, carpenter of the land, the chief Lō’au had visited the island and the couple told him of the plants. Lō’au told them to immediately take the plants to the compound of the Tu’i Tonga where it is said that Lō’au then presented these plants, told him of their properties, and had then instituted the kava ceremony. The ceremony was to memorialize the sacrifice of the child and the parents for their king and his hosts, whereas the king’s partaking of the kava would be acceptance of his duties to care for and lead his people.

Some accounts do vary as to the detail, but this story is cited and known by most Tongans and is the foundation by which many cite the importance of the kava plant and its function in ceremony. Scholars such as renowned Tongan scholar Futa Helu states, “I tend to believe that the kava was originally employed as part of the ancient religion. Then it was socialized to keep order in society, but the myth of the kava seems to point to healing religious practices. It seems to me that human sacrifice was fairly common in ancient times. Perhaps in Tonga or in other parts of Polynesia, and the kava was developed to crowd it out. Yes, it has become the great metaphor of our society, the kava.”  Mele Onga’alupe Taumoepeau, respected educator and Tongan scholar says that the kava represents, “Sacrifice, respect, loyalty to the land, keeping up relations, unity, and giving of one’s life.” Faivaola, Dr. Eric B. Shumway, a noted scholar on Tongan culture and history and traditional matāpule or talking chief of the chief Nuku, produced a film called Kava Kuo Heka in which the importance, history, and usage of the Royal Kava Ceremony is detailed.

Scientific Origins of Kava 
Kava scholar and Fijian anthropologists, S. Apo Aporosa writes, “Archaeologists, linguists and botanists believe kava originated in northern Vanuatu approximately 3000 years ago (Lebot et al., 1992). It is thought that the spread of kava followed early migrational trade routes as far west as Papua New Guinea, to Hawaii in the east, and New Zealand in the south where it failed to grow (Crowley, 1994). As Lebot and Levesque (1989) explain: ‘for kava, dispersal of vegetative propagules by wind or bird is impossible, [and] the plant therefore owes its survival entirely to human distribution of stem cuttings’ (234). Together with kava’s use in indi-genous medicine (Lebot and Cabalion, 1988), the plant in both its raw and drinkable form play significant roles in traditional practice, being widely used to mark life events from birth to death (Aporosa, 2019b). In a number of the Island nations such as Pohnpei (Micronesia), Vanuatu, Fiji, Tonga and Samoa, much of that traditional use remains, whereas in other areas such as Te Au Maohi (the greater Rarotongan island group), French Polynesia and Hawaii, colonial contact and missionization saw kava use reduced and in some cases eliminated altogether (Aporosa, 2014).”

Kava Etymology 
The name for kava is said to derive from the name of the girl, Kava’onau, who was sacrificed by her parents, from whose grave the kava and tō had miraculously sprouted. Kava is known and used throughout Oceania and especially in the Polynesian group of islands but known elsewhere as ‘awa or ‘ava often sour, bitterness, or poisonous. In Fiji, the term yaqona is used for kava, which is similar to the Tongan word kona, meaning poisonous, bitter, or even too salty. Another word, konā means to be intoxicated, often with kava or with alcohol, or poisoned.

It is important to note that the ceremony described herein is known as the Taumafa Kava, which literally means to ‘eat kava’, but is expressed in lieu of kai kava or faikava, the commoner register of the Tongan language. Taumafa Kava is used to denote all kava ceremonies at which the king of Tonga presides. In Tongan society, there are higher registers of language used when referring to or speaking on anything pertaining to other levels of society. The highest being the King and God, the next being his household and the chiefs of the realm such as the Nobility, and the last being the commoners or tu’a. The language used concerning the kava or the kava ceremonies says a lot about the societal makeup or the environment in which kava is being used. The popular term for informal kava drinking by Tongans is faikava, which may be promulgated by Tongan kava social clubs and nearly anyone in the Tongan strata.

Taumafa Kava - Tongan Royal Kava Ceremony 
The Taumafa Kava is held when the king of Tonga is installed with the title, Tu’i Kanokupolu and made the hau, or reigning sovereign and champion of all of Tonga. This ceremony however may take place for funerary rights of the king or members of the royal household. At the Taumafa Kava, often another ceremony takes place simultaneously, the pongipongi hingoa, where a noble title is installed upon a former nobles heir. At the pongipongi hingoa, the traditional food gifts found in the Taumafa Kava are often provided by that soon-to-be noble and his kāīnga and ha’a, distant relatives and clan. If the king is not presiding at the kava ceremony then it is not a Taumafa Kava. A noble kava ceremony of the nobility and chiefs are referred to as ‘ilo kava, whereas kava ceremonies by the commoner class are often referred to simply as kava, or ouau kava, kava ceremony.

Arrangement 
The correct arrangement of the Taumafa Kava is of utmost importance as the traditional seating of the Taumafa Kava follow strict protocols that also follow historical events that determine seating arrangements. The kava protocol and arrangement of chiefs, food, and the execution of ceremony is accomplished by the king’s clan, the Ha’a Ngata. Members of the Ngata clan surround the king’s ‘alofi, kava ring, carrying clubs and spears to protect the sacredness of the ceremony and to “remind” the chiefs of their need to follow protocol. The Kava ceremony is said to also be arranged according to the layout of the great kalia, or double-hulled sailing vessel of Tonga’s past. Tevita Fale, traditional knowledge holder from the ancient capital of Tonga in Lapaha also states that the kava circle is the universe, as the king anciently was thought to be the sun, the rope extended him from the tāno’a was the equator, and both sides of circle represented the opposing hemispheres.

Procedure and Preparation 
It is not sufficient to provide the entirety of the ceremony with all ceremonial words and orders given by the king’s talking chief. Suffice it to say a quick summary will be enough so as not to trivialize the sacredness of the ceremony. Attempts at detailing the kava ceremony have been made before, especially noted is Gifford, however, although a great addition to the academy, the mistakes in language, meaning, and ritual that he summarizes do not do the ceremony justice. The entirety of the ceremony is outlined in Tongan for students in the Kingdom of Tonga but the meanings of angi, ritualized orders, are ancient and carry cultural nuances and socio-cultural meanings that are not easily understood by foreigners. The film Kava Kuo Heka, does an excellent job at emphasizing the importance of the kava ceremony to Tongans as well as provides video recording as narrated and explained by Faivaola.

The king’s Taumafa Kava is arranged according to traditional Tongan ideology of social structure. Emphasis is placed on the senior lines of chiefs and king’s stretching all the way back to the first Tu’i Tonga, ‘Aho’eitu. At the head of the circle is the ‘olovaha, where the king or highest ranking chief in the ‘alofi, ring, sits. Flanking ‘olovaha are the two ‘apa’apa, the two most senior matāpule, or talking chiefs ad heralds of the king. Following them are other chiefs more closely affiliated to the ancient Tu’i Tonga line or chiefs with close affiliation to the current ruling paramount title, the Tu’i Kanokupolu. Also amongst the chiefs are traditional navigators, the royal undertakers, the king’s carpenters, and traditional titles associated with warriors. Along the rims of the circle the king’s nobles and their matāpule are seated according to clan, occupation, and former loyalty afforded the ‘olovaha. At specific points of the circle are chiefs and nobles with specific duties in the circle and they demarcate a special relationship to the king. No two nobles of the Kingdom may sit next to each other, they must be separated by a matāpule or lower ranking chief. At the other end of the circle is the tāno’a, the royal kava bowl and the taukava, kava mixer. Most recently however, the installation ceremonies of the late Tupou V and the current king, HM Tupou VI, three bowls have been used and drank from to symbolize the acceptance of the three major dynastic lines of kings of the ruling monarch. Behind the taukava is the tou’a, where the commoners sit as well as those participating in the ceremony as counters of the food gifts and kava, kava cup servers, and matrilineal relatives of the chiefs in the circle. Incorporated in the tou’a are also very high ranking chiefs, who for varying reasons sit in the tou’a, and their positions are called the tou’a ‘eiki. The chief Ma’u Kilikili, one of the king’s heralds, explains that the kava ceremony is composed of two circles, one with the chiefs, and the other with the commoners. It is the coming together of these two groups of people to drink from the kava as prepared by the people, to signify the role of chiefs in accepting their responsibility as good stewards of their people, whereas the people are expected to serve their chiefs. The arrangement of the kava circle is the physical manifestation of the fonua, the land and people, in communion with their king, where all members of society are represented by one or more of the chiefs.

Procedure  
After all the chiefs have been arranged by the Ha’a Ngata, the king’s right hand talking chief, Motu’apuaka begins with ritualized expressions of gratitude for the kava and food gifts found in the center of the ‘alofi, to which members of the ‘alofi are to repeat along with him. Once this is done, and all is set, the king will then enter the circle, traditionally brought in by a Fijian derived chiefly title to ward of dangers and evil spirits, the Tui Soso, as no Tongan may walk in front of the king, and will be seated at the head of the circle, the ‘olovaha. Motu’apuaka and the king’s left hand talking chief and chief undertaker, Lauaki, will continue with the ritualized expressions of gratitude again. Motu’apuaka will then order that the kava and food be set in order, be there anything out of place. Next Motu’apuaka will order the food be ceremonially lifted up to show there is no weapons hidden. The following ritual then is to count each of the hundreds if not thousands of baskets of food, 400 lbs. Pigs, and varying sizes of kava plants, after which a report of the entirety of the spread will be done by one of the counters. Motu’apuaka will order the kava bowl and the tou’a prepare to receive the kava. Motu’apuaka orders a kava plant, sufficient for the occasion be broken down and divided and given to the kava mixer who will pound and arrange the kava in the bowls. Motu’apuaka will order two helpers to pour water in the bowls and the mixer will begin the ritualized mixing process known as the milolua. Once the fau strainer, wild hibiscus, is put in the bowl ready to strain, the traditional orations begin. Depending on the occasion, a minimum of two speakers from amongst the chiefs will give grand stylized orations concerning the occasion. After the orations, a food offering is prepared and divided out amongst the members of the ‘alofi, at which time the matrilineal relatives of the circles of chiefs will enter the circle and claim the food as their own. The king’s portion must always be accepted on behalf of the king, by a foreigner, as no Tongan ranks high enough to do this honor. When the kava is ready, it shall be called out one of the helpers of the kava mixers, at which the first cup is told to be brought to the king. Following the king, the order of the cups brought, generally go along the ‘alofi, however because of the tou’a ‘eiki, or the high chiefs seated in the tou’a, cups to them may be brought as well not following the circular order. When the kava cup reaches a would-be-noble, all kava serving halts so as to allow Motu’apuaka to officially install that chief with their title and give him the charge and commitment from the king and the people. When the kava is drunk, the person is now a fully installed Noble of the Kingdom of Tonga. Once all of the circle has been served as well as the mixer, a chief of the Ngata clan will alert Motu’apuaka that the kava is done, and Motu’apuaka will thank the Ngata clan for their service and order the kava bowl to be “lifted”. The king will then leave the circle and the ceremony is officially adjourned.

Contemporary and Political Use 
The Taumafa Kava ceremony, in its current form, takes its form from the Tu’i Tonga’s kava ceremony, formerly known as the fulitaunga, which is the ceremony established by Lō’au. There are differences however between the fulitaunga and the Taumafa Kava as used by the Tu’i Kanokupolu. The differences reflect the status of the Tu’i Kanokupolu in relation to the Tu’i Tonga. The Tu’i Tonga once sat with back facing the East during the kava ceremony as he was seen to be the ‘sun’ of the world. The Tu’i Kanokupolu however sits with back facing West, as the traditional seat of power of the Tu’i Kanokupolu was in the Western, Hihifo, district of Tonga, in the village of Kanokupolu. Aesthetic changes have occurred as well such as the kava cup of today made out of coconut shell was once a plantain leaf folded to hold the kava. Also, the tāno’a’s hanger once faced the Tu’i Tonga and divided the ‘alofi into two “hemispheres”. These hemispheres were separated by a rope extending from the bowl to the Tu’i Tonga along with two other kafa, sennit ropes extending to the two matāpule, whereas today the hanger faces the kava mixer. 

The Royal Tongan kava ceremony is still politically significant as it is the ritualized installation of the monarch of Tonga along with the chiefly nobility. The king and nobles are the traditional landholders and may hold government positions within Tongan constitutional monarchy as afforded them according to chiefly right. Since the days of Tonga’s great unifier, Tupou I, the monarchs of Tonga have used the kava ceremony to continue to establish their political power and influence in the kingdom, arranging and rearranging traditional seating as well as holding grand kava ceremonies in which chiefs will pledge their loyalty. During the investiture of Queen Sālote Tupou III at her Taumafa Kava, there were many of the high ranking chiefs who were not present as a form of political rebellion, however, years later the Queen, after much political maneuvering and hard work to attain loyalty from the great chiefs, a grand kava ceremony was held at which all chiefs from all the islands of the Tongan archipelago were expected to attend to show their allegiance and loyalty to Queen and country. Strategic and contemporary Taumafa Kava performance since the days of Tupou I and his great-great-granddaughter, Queen Sālote, is in effect acts of defiance against the colonial forms of leadership acquisition and election. The choice to continually use the Taumafa Kava as the preferred form of installing the monarch and chiefs, is a form of indigenous agency and sovereignty performed by the native people themselves in spite of the many Papālangi, European, modes of governance as enacted in government.

References

External links 
  

Tongan culture
Society of Tonga
Ceremonial food and drink
Rituals
Austronesian spirituality
Kava